John Spalding (fl. 1388), of Kingston upon Hull, Yorkshire, was an English politician and cloth merchant.

Family
Nothing is known of Spalding's family. John Spalding of York was also a cloth merchant at this time in the same county, but there is no proof that they were related.

Career
Spalding was the coroner for Kingston upon Hull by February 1389 until after Michaelmas 1392. He held the title Searcher of ships, Kingston-upon-Hull from 14 November 1379 until 8 February 1384. He was Bailiff of Kingston upon Hull in 1385–86 and 1398–99. He exported cloth from the port of Hull.

He was a Member (MP) of the Parliament of England for Kingston upon Hull in September 1388.

References

English MPs September 1388
14th-century English businesspeople
Politicians from Kingston upon Hull
Year of birth missing
Year of death missing